Meryl Meisler (born 1951) is an American photographer. In the 1970s she photographed in New York City nightclubs and in the 1980s she photographed residents of Bushwick, Brooklyn, while working as a public school teacher there.

Life and work
Meisler was raised on Long Island, New York and went to college in Wisconsin in the midwest. She moved to New York City in 1975 and in the 1970s photographed nightlife in discotheques there such as Studio 54, Paradise Garage and Hurrah. Between 1981 and 1994 she taught at a public middle school in Bushwick, Brooklyn, New York and photographed the area's residents.

Publications
A Tale of Two Cities: Disco Era Bushwick. Brooklyn, NY: Bizarre, 2014. . With an introduction by Catherine Kirkpatrick. Essays by Vanessa Mártir and Meisler. Poetry by Emanuel Xavier.
Purgatory & Paradise: Sassy 70s Suburbia & the City. Brooklyn, NY: Bizarre, 2015. . With an introduction by Catherine Kirkpatrick. Essays by Ernest Drucker, Amy Leffler and Meisler. Poetry by Emanuel Xavier.
 New York: Paradise Lost: Bushwick Era Disco. Woodstock, NY: Parallel Pictures, 2021. . With an introduction by James Panero.  Essays by Vanessa Mártir and Meisler. Poetry by Emanuel Xavier.

References

External links

21st-century American photographers
20th-century American photographers
American women photographers
Photographers from the Bronx
LGBT people from New York (state)
American LGBT photographers
21st-century American women artists
1951 births
Living people
20th-century American women